The Second Brandt cabinet was the government of Germany between 15 December 1972 and 17 May 1974, during the 7th legislature of the Bundestag. Led by the Social Democrat Willy Brandt, the cabinet was a coalition between the Social Democrats (SDP) and the Free Democratic Party (FDP). It followed the Cabinet Brandt I. Following Brandt's resignation as Chancellor on 7 May 1974, Vice-Chancellor Walter Scheel (FDP) served as Acting Chancellor for nine days, until the inception of the Cabinet Schmidt I.

Composition 

|}

See also 
 Cabinet of Germany

References

Brandt I
Brandt I
1972 establishments in West Germany
1974 disestablishments in West Germany
Cabinets established in 1972
Cabinets disestablished in 1974
Willy Brandt